Lea Dabič (born 10 June 1981 in Bohinjska Bistrica) is a retired Slovenian alpine skier who competed in the women's slalom at the 2002 Winter Olympics.

External links
 sports-reference.com
 

1981 births
Living people
Slovenian female alpine skiers
Olympic alpine skiers of Slovenia
Alpine skiers at the 2002 Winter Olympics
People from the Municipality of Bohinj
21st-century Slovenian women